Events from the year 1463 in Ireland.

Incumbent
Lord: Edward IV

Births

Deaths